Pietrafesa may refer to:

 Satriano di Lucania, formerly known as Pietrafesa
 Giovanni De Gregorio, also known as Il Pietrafesa (painter)